Pseudopostega curtarama is a moth of the family Opostegidae. It was described by Donald R. Davis and Jonas R. Stonis, 2007. It is known from the provinces of Goias and Minas Gerais in southern Brazil.

Description 
The length of the forewings is 3.4–5 mm. Adults have been recorded from November to December.

Etymology
The species name is derived from the Latin curtus (meaning short) and ramus (meaning branch), in reference to the short, forked branches of the caudal lobe of the male gnathos.

References

Opostegidae
Moths described in 2007